This is a list of extant valid species and subspecies of the genus Colobopsis.  There are 95 species in this genus.

A 

 Colobopsis abdita
 Colobopsis anderseni
 Colobopsis annetteae
 Colobopsis aruensis
 Colobopsis aurata
 Colobopsis aurelianus

B 

Colobopsis badia
Colobopsis brachycephala
Colobopsis bryani

C 

Colobopsis calva
Colobopsis camelus
Colobopsis cerberula
Colobopsis ceylonica
Colobopsis clerodendri
Colobopsis conica
Colobopsis conithorax
Colobopsis corallina
Colobopsis cotesii
Colobopsis cristata
Colobopsis culmicola
Colobopsis custodula
Colobopsis cylindrica

D 

Colobopsis dentata
Colobopsis desecta

E 

Colobopsis elysii
Colobopsis equus
Colobopsis etiolata
Colobopsis excavata
Colobopsis explodens

F 

Colobopsis fijiana
Colobopsis flavolimbata

G 

Colobopsis gasseri
Colobopsis gundlachi
Colobopsis guppyi

H 

Colobopsis horrens
Colobopsis horripilus
Colobopsis hosei
Colobopsis howensis
Colobopsis hunteri

I 

Colobopsis impressa

[[Colobopsis imitans|Colobopsis imitans]]

 K Colobopsis kadiColobopsis karawaiewi 

 L Colobopsis laminataColobopsis laotseiColobopsis lauensisColobopsis leonardiColobopsis levuanaColobopsis loaColobopsis longi M Colobopsis maafuiColobopsis macarangaeColobopsis macrocephalaColobopsis manniColobopsis markliColobopsis mathildeaeColobopsis mississippiensisColobopsis mutilata 

 N Colobopsis newzealandicaColobopsis nigrifronsColobopsis nipponica O Colobopsis obliquaColobopsis oceanica P Colobopsis papagoColobopsis perneserColobopsis phragmaticolaColobopsis politaeColobopsis polynesicaColobopsis pylartesColobopsis pylora Q Colobopsis quadriceps R Colobopsis reepeniColobopsis riehliiColobopsis rothneyiColobopsis rotundaColobopsis rufifrons  S Colobopsis sadinaColobopsis saginataColobopsis sanguinifronsColobopsis saundersiColobopsis schmeltziColobopsis schmitziColobopsis severiniColobopsis shohkiColobopsis smithianaColobopsis sommeriColobopsis stricta T Colobopsis taivanaeColobopsis trajanusColobopsis tricolorColobopsis tritonColobopsis truncata U Colobopsis umbratilis V Colobopsis vitiensisColobopsis vitrea W Colobopsis wildae''

References

Formicinae
Ant genera
Colobopsis